Events from the year 2007 in Bolivia

Incumbents
President: Evo Morales
Vice President: Álvaro García Linera

Events

January
January 9: Amauris Samartino Flores, a Cuban refugee is expelled.

February

February 3: A State of Emergency is declared in Bolivia after 'El Niño'-like flooding.
February 20: At least 35 people have died and up to 340,000 are affected by flooding after months of heavy rain in Bolivia. The eastern departments of Santa Cruz and Beni are the worst affected.
February 28: The President of Bolivia Evo Morales declares the Bolivian floods as a national disaster with 35 deaths and 72,000 people becoming homeless.

March

March 16: The Inter-American Development Bank forgives US$4.4 billion in debt owed by Bolivia, Honduras, Nicaragua, Haiti and Guyana, five of the poorest countries in the Americas.

April

May

June

June 26: Bolivia reclaims two oil refineries from Brazilian state-owned energy company Petrobras.

July

July 20: Hundreds of thousands of Bolivians protest proposals to shift the capital from La Paz to Sucre.

August

August 10: The President of Venezuela Hugo Chávez meets with the President of Bolivia Evo Morales and the President of Argentina Néstor Kirchner in Tarija, Bolivia.

September

October

November

November 26: At least three people die in clashes over a new draft constitution in Sucre, Bolivia.

December

December 17: The leaders of Brazil, Bolivia, and Chile agree to build a highway by 2009 that will link the Atlantic (in Santos, Brazil) and the Pacific (in Iquique, Chile) coasts of South America.
December 17: The Bolivian departments of Beni, Pando, Santa Cruz, and Tarija declare autonomy from Evo Morales' central government.

Deaths

November 23: Óscar Carmelo Sánchez, 36, footballer, cancer.

References

 
Years of the 21st century in Bolivia
Bolivia
2000s in Bolivia
Bolivia